ZUMIX is a non-profit cultural organization located in East Boston, Massachusetts.  The organization is dedicated to using the arts, particularly music, to build community, foster cultural understanding, and encourage self-expression among urban youth in the neighborhood. ZUMIX works primarily with low-income or at-risk youth, ranging from ages eight to eighteen.

History
ZUMIX was founded in 1991 as a small-scale operation run out of the homes of co-founders Madeleine Steczynski and Bob Grove. It was founded as their response to a growing number of homicides among youth in Boston. Addressing the problems of escalating violence, substance abuse, and mortality, the organization sought to provide alternative ways for youth to deal with their issues. Currently, they serve approximately 500 youth per year in after-school and summer programs, plus an additional 500 youth through in-school partnerships with East Boston High School and the Mario Umana Academy.

Programs

ZUMIX offers programs in Instrumental Music, Songwriting & Performance, Music Technology, and Radio.  There is also a ZUMIX Sprouts program which encompass the seven through eleven age group. ZUMIX Radio broadcasts on WZMR-LP 94.9 FM.

References

External links
 Official site

Organizations established in 1991
Non-profit organizations based in Boston
East Boston
1991 establishments in Massachusetts